The genus Prioniturus, commonly known as racket-tails, contains nine parrot species found in the Philippines and Indonesia. They are easily distinguished from all other parrots by their elongated central tail feathers with the bare shaft and spatula at the end.

Taxonomy
The following nine species and several subspecies are recognized in the genus:

Prioniturus, Wagler 1832
Prioniturus montanus, Ogilvie-Grant 1895 (Montane racket-tail)
Prioniturus waterstradti, Rothschild 1904 (Mindanao racket-tail)
Prioniturus waterstradti waterstradti, Rothschild 1904
Prioniturus waterstradti malindangensis, Mearns 1909
Prioniturus platenae, Blasius, W 1888 (Blue-headed racket-tail)
Prioniturus luconensis, Steere 1890 (Green racket-tail)
Prioniturus discurus, (Vieillot 1822) (Blue-crowned racket-tail)
Prioniturus discurus discurus, (Vieillot 1822)
Prioniturus discurus whiteheadi, Salomonsen 1953
Prioniturus mindorensis, Steere 1890 (Mindoro racket-tail)
Prioniturus verticalis, Sharpe 1893 (Blue-winged racket-tail or Sulu Racket-tail)
Prioniturus flavicans, Cassin 1853 (Yellow-breasted racket-tail)
Prioniturus platurus, (Vieillot 1818) (Golden-mantled racket-tail)
Prioniturus platurus platurus, (Vieillot 1818)
Prioniturus platurus sinerubris, Forshaw 1971
Prioniturus platurus talautensis, Hartert 1898
Prioniturus mada, Hartert1900 (Buru racket-tail)

See also
 Racket-tail (disambiguation)

References

Cited texts

Parrots
Psittaculini